Archibald Ean Campbell (1 June 1856 – 18 April 1921) was an Anglican bishop.

Early life and education
Campbell born on 1 June 1856 in the Carmyle area of Glasgow, the son of Colonel Walter Campbell of Skipness, cousin of the Duke of Argyll and Anna Henrietta Loring. He was educated at King William's College, Clare College, Cambridge, and the Theological College at Cuddesdon. He earned a Bachelor of Arts from Clare College in 1880, a Master of Arts in 1883, a Doctor of Divinity in 1904 and a Doctor of Civil Law in 1910.

Ordained ministry
Campbell was ordained deacon by the Bishop of Oxford, John Mackarness, in 1881, and priest in 1882 by the Bishop of Llandaff, Alfred Ollivant. After a curacy in Aberdare between 1881 and 1885, he became rector of Castle Rising, where he remained until 1891. In 1891, he became vicar of All Souls' Church in Leeds, while between 1901 and 1904 he was provost of St Ninian's Cathedral, Perth.

Bishop
Campbell was elected as the fifth Bishop of Glasgow and Galloway on 8 December 1903 and was consecrated to the episcopate on 24 February 1904 at St Mary's Cathedral, Glasgow. He died in office on 18 April 1921.

References

1856 births
People educated at King William's College
Alumni of Clare College, Cambridge
Provosts of St Ninian's Cathedral, Perth
Bishops of Glasgow and Galloway
20th-century Scottish Episcopalian bishops
1921 deaths
People from Castle Rising